The Russian Orbital Service Station (Rossiyskaya orbital'naya sluzhebnaya stantsiya) (ROSS) is a proposed Russian orbital space station scheduled to begin construction in 2027. Initially an evolution of the Orbital Piloted Assembly and Experiment Complex (OPSEK) concept, ROSS developed into plans for a new standalone Russian space station built from scratch without modules from the Russian Orbital Segment of the ISS.

Overview 
In April 2021, Roscosmos officials announced plans to possibly exit from the International Space Station programme after 2024, stating concerns about the condition of its aging modules. On 26 July 2022, Roscosmos announced that the decision had been made to withdraw from the ISS programme after 2024. A new space station, named Russian Orbital Space Station, operated entirely by Roscosmos, would be launched starting in the mid-2020s.

ROSS will operate at a 400 km altitude sun-synchronous orbit, which will allow it to monitor the entire surface of the Earth, especially the Arctic region. This orbit will enable the station to serve two important functions: high-frequency observations of Russia from space, and easier access to the station compared to the ISS, which will allow for more medical and physiological experiments to be conducted than what is currently feasible on the Russian Orbital Segment of the ISS.

Planned modules 

NEM-1, also known as Science Power Module 1 (SPM-1), will be the core module of ROSS. Initially intended to be launched to the International Space Station in 2024, NEM-1 will instead undergo 1.5–2 years of redesign to prepare the module for its new role as part of ROSS. As of January 2023, NEM-1 is scheduled to launch in 2027 on an Angara A5 launch vehicle from Vostochny Cosmodrome and new Core module (similar to NEM-1) is scheduled to launch no earlier than 2028.

ROSS is envisioned to include up to seven modules, with 2035 being the targeted completion date. The first stage of construction will consist of four modules: the base NEM-1 module, an upgraded NEM, a node module, and a gateway module. The second stage will include logistics and production modules, as well as a platform module for servicing spacecraft. A commercial module for up to four space tourists is also under consideration.

See also 
 List of space stations
 Lunar Orbital Station

References

External links 
 Russian Orbital Service Station, ROSS

Roscosmos
Proposed space stations
2020s in spaceflight
2020s in Russia